Alan Cardoso de Andrade (born 5 January 1998), known as Alan Cardoso or simply Alan, is a Brazilian footballer for Resende. Mainly a left back, he can also play as a left midfielder.

Club career

Vasco da Gama
Alan Cardoso was born in Rio de Janeiro, and joined Vasco da Gama's youth setup in 2006 at the age of eight. On 16 July 2016, he made his first team debut by starting in a 1–1 Série B away draw against Luverdense.

Alan Cardoso contributed with nine appearances (three starts) during his first season, as his side achieved promotion to the Série A. He made his debut in that category on 15 June 2017, starting in a 2–1 loss at Chapecoense; playing as a midfielder, he was replaced by Andrezinho in the 27th minute after being booked early in the match.

On 25 April 2018, Alan Cardoso was loaned to Série C side ABC until the end of the year. In August, however, he suffered a knee injury and returned to his parent club for treatment.

Santos
On 28 February 2019, Alan Cardoso signed a three-year contract with Santos. Assigned to the B-team, he was loaned to Londrina on 20 July 2020.

Career statistics

References

External links

1998 births
Living people
Footballers from Rio de Janeiro (city)
Brazilian footballers
Brazil youth international footballers
Association football defenders
Campeonato Brasileiro Série A players
Campeonato Brasileiro Série B players
Campeonato Brasileiro Série C players
CR Vasco da Gama players
ABC Futebol Clube players
Santos FC players
Londrina Esporte Clube players
Santa Cruz Futebol Clube players
Paysandu Sport Club players
Resende Futebol Clube players